Rayangala Shri Krishna Raja Narayana Perumal Ramanujam Naicker (16 September 1923 – 17 May 2021), shortened to Ki. Rajanarayanan and popularly known by his Tamil initials as Ki. Ra., was an Indian Tamil language folklorist and acclaimed writer from Kovilpatti, in Tamil Nadu. Some of his popular works include Gopalla Grammam, Gopallapurathu Makkal, Mayamaan, and Nattuppura Kadhai Kalanjiyam. He was a recipient of the Sahitya Akademi Award in 1991.The Times of India called him the "Guardian of Tamil oral tradition".

Early life
Rajanarayanan was born on 16 September 1923 in the village of Idaiseval near Kovilpatti in present-day Thoothukudi district, Tamil Nadu. He was the fifth child of Lakshmi Ammal and Shri Krishna Ramanujam. He suffered from poor health and was afflicted with tuberculosis at an early age. He dropped out of school in the seventh standard. He went on to become a member of the Communist Party of India (CPI), going to prison twice for his participation and support in the CPI-organised peasant rebellions between 1947 and 1951. He was also named in the Nellai Conspiracy Case of 1952, though the charges were later dropped.

Career
Rajanarayanan began his literary career at the age of 30 and wrote under his Tamil initials Ki. Ra. His first short story "Mayamaan" was published in the magazine Saraswati in 1959. It was an immediate success. It was followed by many more short stories. Ki. Ra.'s stories were usually based in karisal kaadu around his native region of Kovilpatti. The stories are usually centered around Karisal country's people, their lives, beliefs, struggles and folklore. Gopalla Grammam and its sequel Gopallapurathu Makkal were among his most acclaimed novels, with the latter winning him the Sahitya Akademi Award in 1991. The novel deals with the stories of multiple people living in a village in south India before the arrival of the British. It involves the migration of the Telugu people escaping brutal kingdoms north of Tamil Nadu. These books were followed by Andaman Naicker.

As a folklorist, Ki. Ra. spent decades collecting folktales from the karisal kaadu and publishing them in popular magazines. In 2007, the Thanjavur-based publishing house Annam compiled these folktales into a 944-page book, the Nattuppura Kadhai Kalanjiyam. As of 2009, he had published approximately 30 books. A selection of these books were translated into English by Pritham K. Chakravarthy and published in 2009 as Where Are You Going, You Monkeys? – Folktales from Tamil Nadu. Ki. Ra. was also well known for his candid treatment of sexual topics, and use of the spoken dialect of Tamil for his stories, rather than its formal written form. He viewed the spoken language as the 'correct' form of the language. In addition to writing stories in the regional dialects, he also was an author of a dictionary of the regional dialect called Karisal Kaatu Sollagarathi. This work was a frontrunner for similar dictionaries for dialects from other regions of the state. 

In 1992, his short story Current was made into a Hindi film entitled  Current for the National Film Development Corporation of India. 

In 2003, his short story kidai was made into a Tamil film entitled Oruththi and was screened at the International Film Festival of India.

He was appointed a professor of folklore at Pondicherry University in the 1980s. He held the title of Director of Folktales in the university's Documentation and Survey Centre. Between 1998 and 2002 he also served in the general council and the advisory board of the Sahitya Akademi.

He was a recipient of the Sahitya Akademi Award for his novel Gopallapurathu Makkal in 1991.

Personal life 
On 16 September 1954, Rajanarayanan married Kanavathi Ammal (classmate of his younger sister Ethirajam ; also a cousin) . The couple had two sons. Kanavathi died on 25 September 2019. She was aged 87.

Rajanarayanan died on 18 May 2021 due to age-related illness in Puducherry. He was cremated with state honours in his native village of Idaiseval.

Awards and recognition
 1971Tamil valarchi araichi mandram award
 1979Ilakkiya chinthanai award
 1990Santhome International Christian Society Best Writer Award
 1991Sahitya Akademi Award for his novel Gopallapurarthu Makkal
 2008M.A. Chidambaram award
 2016Literary achievement special award from The Tamil Literary Garden.

Bibliography
Source(s):

Folktales
 Tamizhnattu nadodi kathaigal (1966)
 Tamizhnattu gramiya kathaigal (1977)
 Thatha chonna kathaigal (1984)
 Naattupura kathaigal part - 1(1991)
 Naattupura kathaigal part - 2(1992)
 Vayathu vanthavargalukku mattum (1992)
 Kaathil viluntha kathaigal (1992)
 Puthuvai vattara Naattupura kathaigal (1993)
 Naattupura paaliyal kathaigal (1994)
 Penn manam (1995)
 Peruviral kullan (1998)

Short stories
 Kalavu (1965)
 Kannimai (1975)
 Appa pillai, Amma pillai (1980)
 Kidai kurunavalum, pannirandu sirukathaigalum (1983)
 Karisal kathaigal (1984)
 Koththai paruththi (1985)
 Ki.Rajanarayanan kathaigal (1998)

Novels
 Mayamaan (lit. The magical deer) (1958)
 Gopalla gramam (1976)
 Pinchukal (1979)
 Gopallapurathu makkal (1989)
 Anthaman nayakkar (1995)

Essays
 Karisal kaatu kadidhasi (1988)
 Ki.Rajanarayanan katturaigal (1991)
 Puthaga kaathalar (1998)

Others
 Maantharul oru annaparavai (biographical sketches of Rasigamani) (1981)
 Vattara valakku sollakarathi (Dictionary) (1982)
 Ku.Azhagirisamy kadithankal (1987) 
 Makkal Tamil vazhallku (1991)
Karisal Kaattu kadudasi – volumes 1&2 (lit. letter from the scorched earth), Agaram (1991)
 Ki.Rajanarayanan pathilgal (1994)
 Kadithangal Kadithangal (1998)
Maraivai sonna kathaikal (lit. Hidden stories)
Oruthi (screenplay)(lit. One woman)(2003)
(ed.)Nattuppura Kadhai Kalanjiyam (lit. Collection of Country Tales), Annam (2007)
Ki. Ra. Natkurippilirundhu (lit. From the diary of Ki. Ra) 
Vetti

See also
 List of Indian writers

References

External links

1923 births
2021 deaths
Indian folklorists
Tamil-language writers
Children's writers in Tamil
People from Tamil Nadu
Recipients of the Sahitya Akademi Award in Tamil
Communist Party of India politicians from Tamil Nadu
Academic staff of Pondicherry University
People from Thoothukudi district